The 1982 Pau Grand Prix was a Formula Two motor race held on 31 May 1982 at the Pau circuit, in Pau, Pyrénées-Atlantiques, France. The Grand Prix was won by Johnny Cecotto, driving the March 822. Thierry Boutsen finished second and Mike Thackwell third.

After leading much of the race, Corrado Fabi retired leaving Thierry Boutsen and a charging Johnny Cecotto as the two front-runners in the final laps. Eventually, Cecotto passed Boutsen for the lead to take his second win of the 1982 European Formula Two season and take his first Pau Grand Prix win.

Classification

Race

References

Pau Grand Prix
1982 in French motorsport